Ibn al-Dahhak (died 927) was a Kurdish chieftain, who abandoned Islam, converted to Christianity and entered the service of the Byzantine emperor Romanos I Lekapenos (reigned 920–944). Romanos gave him rich gifts and sent him back to his base, the fortress of al-Ja'fari, located probably in the vicinity of Tarsus. In late autumn 927, however, he was attacked, defeated and killed by the Abbasid governor of Tarsus, Thamal al-Dulafi.

References

Sources
 

927 deaths
Kurdish Christians
10th-century Kurdish people
Converts to Christianity from Islam
People of the Arab–Byzantine wars
People killed in action